Lizardo García Sorroza (26 April 1844 – 29 May 1937) was President of Ecuador from 1 September 1905 to 15 January 1906.

Life
García was born in Guayaquil. He founded the chamber of commerce of Guayaquil and was a member of the firefighters of his hometown.

Political life
 Minister of Finance in 1895
 Senator for the province Guayas
 Vice President of the Senate
 Councilman of Guayaquil

Garcia was also a candidate in the presidential election of 1901, but lost to Leonidas Plaza.

Presidency
Garcia was elected president in 1905, but only served for a few months. He was overthrown by the revolution led by Eloy Alfaro and was forced to leave office.

References

Lizardo Garcia Sorrroza. diccionariobiograficoecuador.com
 Official Website of the Ecuadorian Government about the country President's History
 Cámara de Comercio Guayaquil

1844 births
1937 deaths
People from Guayaquil
Presidents of Ecuador
Government ministers of Ecuador
Ecuadorian Ministers of Finance